Sultan Karim Ali (born 1931) is a Pakistani former swimmer. He competed in two events at the 1948 Summer Olympics.

References

External links
 

1931 births
Possibly living people
Pakistani male swimmers
Olympic swimmers of Pakistan
Swimmers at the 1948 Summer Olympics
Place of birth missing (living people)